Thompson is a borough in Susquehanna County, Pennsylvania, United States. The population was 255 at the 2020 census.

Geography
Thompson is located at  (41.862354, -75.515864).

History
Thompson Borough was incorporated on August 15, 1876 from part of Thompson Township.  Both were named after Susquehanna County associate judge William Thompson.

The Spencer Milling Company gristmill was built on Jackson Street by G. Fenton Spencer in 1870.

Demographics

At the 2010 census there were 299 people, 126 households, and 78 families residing in the borough. The population density was 598 people per square mile (233.5/km2). There were 163 housing units at an average density of 326 per square mile (127.3/km2). The racial makeup of the borough was 98.7% White, 0.3% African American, and 1% from two or more races. Hispanic or Latino of any race were 0.7%.

Of the 126 households, 26.2% had children under the age of 18 living with them, 42.1% were married couples living together, 14.3% had a female householder with no husband present, and 38.1% were non-families. 27.8% of households were one person, and 11.1% were one person aged 65 or older. The average household size was 2.37 and the average family size was 2.90.

In the borough the population was spread out, with 23.1% under the age of 18, 60.8% from 18 to 64, and 16.1% 65 or older. The median age was 42 years.

The median household income was $31,875 and the median family income was $31,250. Males had a median income of $30,000 versus $19,688 for females. The per capita income for the borough was $14,883. About 20.7% of families and 25.1% of the population were below the poverty line, including 36.3% of those under the age of eighteen and 35.7% of those 65 or over.

References

Boroughs in Susquehanna County, Pennsylvania
Populated places established in 1876
1876 establishments in Pennsylvania